Cristián Javier Bautista (Born December 10, 1987 in La Union) is a  Salvadoran professional footballer, who plays as a  striker.

Club career

Atlético Balboa
Bautista started his professional career at his hometown club, Atlético Balboa in 2005.

Once Municipal
He then had spell at Once Municipal in 2006.

Águila
He signed with Águila in 2007.

Return to Atlético Balboa
Bautista signed again with Atlético Balboa in 2010.

International career
Bautista debuted with El Salvador on February 9, 2011.

He could only play the few last minutes of the friendly match against Haiti, at the Estadio Cuscatlán.

He scored his first international goal against the Dominican Republic in a 2014 FIFA World Cup qualification match and played the full 90 minutes.

International goals

Honours

Club 
Once Municipal
 Primera División
 Champion: Apertura 2006

A.D. Isidro Metapán
 Primera División
 Champion: Apertura 2011, Apertura 2012
 Runners-up: Clausura 2012

C.D. Águila
 Primera División
 Runners-up: Apertura 2014

References

External links
 Christian Javier Bautista at Soccerway 

1987 births
Living people
People from La Unión Department
Salvadoran footballers
A.D. Isidro Metapán footballers
Atlético Balboa footballers
Once Municipal footballers
C.D. Águila footballers
Association football forwards